Legislative elections were held in France on 18 and 24 August 1815 for the first Chamber of Deputies of the Bourbon Restoration.

Electoral system
Electoral colleges elected a number of candidates equal to the number of deputies. Electoral colleges of the departments chose half of the deputies from these candidates and the other half were chosen freely.

Results
The Ultra-royalists won 350 seats. The parliament later became known as the Chambre introuvable.

References

1815 08
France 2
Legislative 2